Opalimosina is a genus of flies belonging to the family Lesser Dung flies.

Species
Subgenus Dentilimosina Roháček, 1983
O. denticulata (Duda, 1924)
Subgenus Hackmanina Roháček, 1983
O. czernyi (Duda, 1918)
Subgenus Opalimosina Roháček, 1983
O. australis Hayashi, 2009
O. calcarifera (Roháček, 1975)
O. collini (Richards, 1929)
O. dolichodasys Hayashi, 2010
O. mirabilis (Collin, 1902)
O. monticola Hayashi, 2010
O. pseudomirabilis Hayashi, 1989
O. simplex (Richards, 1929)
O. spathulata Hayashi, 2010
O. stepheni Papp, 1991
Subgenus Pappiella Roháček, 1983
O. liliputana (Rondani, 1880)

References

Sphaeroceridae
Muscomorph flies of Europe
Diptera of Asia
Diptera of North America
Diptera of South America
Diptera of Australasia
Sphaeroceroidea genera